"Parece Sincera" is the first single from El Roockie's 2007 album Semblante Urbano.

Chart positions

References

2007 singles
2007 songs